Kamianka-Dniprovska is a city in Zaporizhzhia Oblast, Ukraine. It served as the administrative center of Kamianka-Dniprovska Raion until that raion was absorbed into Vasylivka Raion in 2020. Population: 

It is located on the south bank of a west-flowing part of the Dnieper River.  On the north bank is the town of Nikopol, Ukraine.    About 15km east is the power plant at Enerhodar. The river is now part of the Kakhovka Reservoir. The landscape of the area is flat and steppe-like.

History 
In 1701 Russia built a fort here called Kammeny Zaton ("Stoney Backwater"). It interacted with the Cossack settlements on the north side of the river.

City since 1957.

In 1972 the population was 16 900 people.

In January 1989 the population was 17 906 people.

In January 2013 the population was 13 495 people.

The city is home to the Kamianka-Dniprovska District Historical and Archeological Museum. An archeological site near Kamianka-Dniprovska gives evidence suggesting that the city was once the capital of the ancient Scythian Kingdom.

Gallery

References

Cities in Zaporizhzhia Oblast
Taurida Governorate
Cities of district significance in Ukraine
Populated places established in the Russian Empire
Populated places on the Dnieper in Ukraine
Populated places of Kakhovka Reservoir
1957 establishments in the Soviet Union